A Close Call for Ellery Queen is a 1942 American mystery film directed by James P. Hogan and written by Eric Taylor and Gertrude Purcell. It is based on the 1939 novel The Dragon's Teeth: A Problem in Deduction by Ellery Queen. The film stars William Gargan, Margaret Lindsay, Charley Grapewin, Ralph Morgan, Kay Linaker, Edward Norris and James Burke. The film was released on January 29, 1942, by Columbia Pictures.

Plot

Cast          
William Gargan as Ellery Queen
Margaret Lindsay as Nikki Porter
Charley Grapewin as Inspector Queen
Ralph Morgan as Alan Rogers
Kay Linaker as Margo Rogers
Edward Norris as Stewart Cole
James Burke as Sergeant Velle
Addison Richards as Lester Young
Charles Judels as Corday
Andrew Tombes as Bates
Claire Du Brey as Deborah 
Micheline Cheirel as Marie Dubois
Ben Welden as Watchman
Milton Parsons as Butler

References

External links
 

1942 films
1940s English-language films
American mystery films
1942 mystery films
Columbia Pictures films
Films directed by James Patrick Hogan
American black-and-white films
1940s American films
Ellery Queen films